Hayden Chun Hay Szeto (born September 11, 1985) is a Canadian actor of Hong Kong descent, known for his role as Erwin Kim in the comedy-drama film The Edge of Seventeen (2016). In 2017, he portrayed Ken Luang in the NBC comedy series The Good Place.

Early life
Szeto was raised in the Richmond, British Columbia area, with two parents from Hong Kong. Szeto comes from a long line of artistic talent. His father, Nigel Szeto, is a painter, and his paternal grandfather, Kei Szeto ( Situ Qi, 司徒奇), was a revered Chinese sculptor. His great-grand father Szeto Mei was a notable poet. He studied sociology at Kwantlen Polytechnic University. Szeto graduated from the New York Film Academy's Acting for Film program in 2011.

Career
In 2016, Szeto made his breakthrough role playing Erwin Kim in Kelly Fremon Craig's coming-of-age comedy-drama The Edge of Seventeen alongside Hailee Steinfeld. He had a recurring role in the second season of NBC's comedy series The Good Place, portraying a Buddhist monk named Ken Luang.

On May 24, 2017, Szeto was cast as Brad Chang in the Blumhouse supernatural thriller film Truth or Dare. The film was released in theaters on April 13, 2018.

Filmography

Film

Television

References

External links
 

1985 births
21st-century Canadian male actors
Canadian male actors of Hong Kong descent
Canadian male film actors
Canadian male television actors
Kwantlen Polytechnic University alumni
Living people
Male actors from Vancouver
New York Film Academy alumni